Planica 1938 was a ski flying study week, allowed only in study purposes, with main competition held on 16 March 1938 in Planica, Drava Banovina, Kingdom of Yugoslavia.

Schedule

Competition
On 15 March 1938, official training day was held with five competitors from three countries: Austria, Yugoslavia and Nazi Germany. Josef Bradl set another world record in last 4th round at 107 metres (351 ft).

On 16 March 1938, ski flying study competition was on schedule with only four jumpers on start, each with five jumps. After two years, Josef Bradl won the competition again. Novšak didn't jump due to injury.

Official training
15 March 1938 – 14:00 PM – chronological order not available

 World record! Fall or touch!

Official results

Ski Flying Study competition
16 March 1938 – Five rounds – the best jump counted

Ski flying world record

Note
On 12 March 1938, just a couple of days before the competition, Austria was officially annexed and joined with Nazi Germany. However, both Austrian ski jumpers (Josef Bradl, Walter Delle Karth) still performed under the flag of Austria.

References

1938 in Yugoslav sport
1938 in ski jumping
1938 in Slovenia
Ski jumping competitions in Yugoslavia
International sports competitions hosted by Yugoslavia
Ski jumping competitions in Slovenia
International sports competitions hosted by Slovenia